Woman Between Wolf and Dog is a 1979 Belgian-French drama film directed by André Delvaux. It was entered into the 1979 Cannes Film Festival and received the André Cavens Award for Best Film by the Belgian Film Critics Association (UCC). The film was also selected as the Belgian entry for the Best Foreign Language Film at the 52nd Academy Awards, but was not accepted as a nominee.

Cast
 Marie-Christine Barrault as Lieve
 Rutger Hauer as Adriaan
 Roger van Hool as François
 Senne Rouffaer as The Priest
 Bert André as Slager
 Raf Reymen as Oom Georges
 Hector Camerlynck as Uncle Odilon
 Mathieu Carrière as Soldier from Germany
 Yves Robert as Werkman
 Tine Balder as Tante Mélanie
 Jenny Tanghe as Tante Anna
 Greta van Langhendonck as Susanne
 Janine Bischops as Tante Leontien
 Johny Voners as Uncle Nand
 Marc Bober as Postbode
 Jean-Claude Van Damme as Movie Goer / Man In Garden (uncredited)

See also
 Rutger Hauer filmography
 List of submissions to the 52nd Academy Awards for Best Foreign Language Film
 List of Belgian submissions for the Academy Award for Best Foreign Language Film

References

External links

1979 films
1979 drama films
Belgian drama films
French drama films
1970s Dutch-language films
Films directed by André Delvaux
Dutch-language Belgian films
1970s French films